Corail may refer to:

Corail (train), an SNCF service train in France
Corail Arrondissement, an administrative division in Grand'Anse, Haiti
Corail, Grand'Anse, a commune in Corail Arrondissement
Corail City, the principal town of Corail
The Pinova apple cultivar, also known as Corail

See also

Korail, a South Korean train operator